This is a list of the mayors, lord mayors and administrators of Wollongong City Council and its predecessors, a local government area of New South Wales, Australia. The official title of a lord mayor while holding office is The Right Worshipful Lord Mayor of Wollongong.

History of the office
First incorporated on 28 February 1859 as the 'Municipality of Wollongong', the council became known as the 'City of Wollongong' on 11 September 1942. On 3 September 1947, the City of Wollongong, the Shire of Bulli (established 1906) and the Municipalities of Central Illawarra (established 1859) and North Illawarra (established 1868) amalgamated to form the 'City of Greater Wollongong' under the Local Government Act 1919. On 10 April 1970 the council was granted the title of 'Lord Mayor' by Queen Elizabeth II. On 30 October 1970 the official title of the council reverted to become the 'City of Wollongong'. On 1 July 1993 following the enactment of a new Local Government Act, elected representatives of the council were to be known as 'Councillor', replacing the former title of 'Alderman'. Originally nominated annually by the council, the mayor is now popularly elected for a four-year term.

On 4 March 2008, following recommendations from Independent Commission Against Corruption Commissioner Jerrold Cripps QC, the Minister for Local Government requested the Governor of New South Wales to dismiss the council and install a panel of administrators (Gabrielle Kibble AO, Dr Colin Gellatly and Robert McGregor AM) for four years citing clear evidence of systemic corruption in the Council.

The current Lord Mayor of Wollongong is Councillor Gordon Bradbery (Independent), elected on 3 September 2011, who replaced the board of administrators who had run the council since 2008. Bradbery was re-elected for a further three-year term on 9 September 2017.

List of incumbents

Wollongong Municipal/City Council, 1859–1946

Central Illawarra Shire Council, 1859–1947

North Illawarra Municipal Council, 1868–1947

Bulli Shire Council, 1906–1947

Greater Wollongong/Wollongong City Council, 1947–present

Notes and references

External links
 The City of Wollongong (Council website)

Wollongong
Mayors
 
Mayors